Radio Studio M or Radio Studio M Teslić is a Bosnian local commercial radio station, broadcasting from Teslić, Bosnia and Herzegovina. This radio station broadcasts a variety of programs such as music and local news.

Radio Studio M was founded in June 1998. Program is mainly produced in Serbian language at two FM frequencies and it is available in the city of Teslić as well as in nearby municipalities in Banja Luka and Doboj area. The owner of the radio station is the company Momčilović-Studio M d.o.o. Teslić.

Estimated number of listeners of Radio Studio M is around 219.280.

Frequencies
 Doboj 
 Banja Luka

See also 
 List of radio stations in Bosnia and Herzegovina
 Radio M
 Radio Doboj
 Radio Zenica
 PST radio
 K3 Radio Prnjavor

References

External links 
 www.studiomteslic.net
 www.radiostanica.ba
 www.fmscan.org
 Communications Regulatory Agency of Bosnia and Herzegovina

Teslić
Radio stations established in 1998
Teslić